The Vorarlberg University of Applied Sciences in Dornbirn in Vorarlberg (Austria) is a leading Austrian University of Applied Sciences. It was founded in 1989 going under the name of "Technical School, Vorarlberg".

Its charter is to provide degree programmes with a direct link to work practice. About 1.300 students are currently enrolled in Bachelor's and master's degrees in the areas of Business, Engineering, Design and Social Work. FH Vorarlberg enjoys excellent relations with business and industry in Vorarlberg. Many of the companies are world leaders or among world leaders in their areas. Close cooperation with these top companies means that students can choose from a range of internships and graduates have excellent job prospects. The number of research contracts from business and industry is proof of FH Vorarlberg's strong links to high-tech companies. For instance, in January 2014, the Josef-Ressel-Center for microtechnology has been inaugurated at FH Vorarlberg.

Awards 

2016, 2017: Erasmus+ Award (for the excellent quality in organizing student and staff mobility)
2016: Science Award Vorarlberg (awarded to Dr. habil. Dana Seyringer, PhD, Research centre Microtechnology)
2014, 2016, 2017: National Award for Family-Friendly University of Applied Sciences (awarded by the Federal Ministry for Family and Youth)
2014: Austrian Environmental Education Award ("Ethify Yourself")
2014: Best Austrian University of Applied Sciences in the field of Technology
National Award for Innovation 2013 (special award VERENA for Thien  GmbH in cooperation with the FH Vorarlberg)
Österreichischer Bauherrenpreis 2000 (Austrian Property Developer Prize)

Degree courses 
The FH Vorarlberg offers the following degree courses (status as of 2019):

 Business Administration
 International Business (BA)
 Accounting, Controlling & Finance (MA)
 Business Process Management (MA)
 Human Resources & Organisation (MA)
 International Marketing & Sales (MA)
 International Management and Leadership (MA)
 Engineering & Technology
 Engineering and Management (BSc)
 Electrical Engineering Dual (BSc)
 Computer Science (BSc)
 Informatik – Digital Innovation (BSc)
 Mechatronics (BSc)
 Mechanical Engineering (BSc)
 Energy Technology & Energy Economics (MSc)
 Computer Science (MSc)
 Mechatronics (MSc)
 Design
 InterMedia (BA)
 InterMedia (MA)
 Social Work & Health
 Social Work (BA)
 Social Work (MA)

References

External links

 English website of Vorarlberg University of Applied Sciences 
 FHV ALUMNI: Alumni Association of FH Vorarlberg
 FHV COMMUNITY: the communications platform of FH Vorarlberg
 Ressel Centre for microtechnology
 

 
Educational institutions established in 1989
1989 establishments in Austria